The electoral division of Launceston is one of 15 electorates or seats in the Tasmanian Legislative Council, created in 2008. It also previously existed until 1999, when it was abolished and substantially incorporated into the new division of Paterson, which was in turn abolished in 2008.

The division of Launceston includes the Launceston city council suburbs of West Launceston, Summerhill, Kings Meadows, Prospect, Glen Dhu, Norwood and Youngtown. It also included the Meander Valley council areas of Prospect Vale and Blackstone Heights. Its southern border was shared with present-day Launceston city council, its northern the South Esk River and Bathurst Street in the central business district. Its western border was Lake Trevallyn.

Most of the electorate was merged with the northern area of Macquarie to create the Electoral division of Paterson. The suburbs of West Launceston, Trevallyn were merged with the existing Cornwall to create the Rosevears. A small area became part of Windermere.

Members

See also

 Electoral division of Paterson
 Tasmanian House of Assembly

References

 Tasmanian Electoral Commission

External links
Parliament of Tasmania
Tasmanian Electoral Commission - Legislative Council

Launceston
Northern Tasmania